Very Rev. Fr. Moses Orshio Adasu (12 June 1945 - 20 November 2005) became governor of Benue State, Nigeria on 2 January 1992, elected on the Social Democratic Party (SDP) platform. He left office after the military coup in November 1993 in which General Sani Abacha came to power.

Background

Adasu was born on 12 June 1945 at Mbaamena, near Awajir in Shangev-Tiev District of Konshisha Local Government Area of Benue State.
He studied at St. James Junior Seminary Keffi (1966–1968). 
He then attended St. Augustine's Major Seminary, Jos, an affiliate of the Propaganda Fide, (1969–1972), graduating with a bachelor's degree in Divinity. 
Later he studied at St. John's University, New York City (1975–1976), earning an M.A. degree, and then at Catholic University of America, Washington DC (1976–1978) where he gained a Masters of Religious Education.

Adasu was a Senior Inspector of Education at the Benue State Ministry of Education headquarters, Makurdi. He also taught in Secondary and Teachers Colleges in Jos, Otukpo and Adikpo, and at the Colleges of Education in Akwanga and Katsina-Ala. 
He was a member of the Christian Pilgrims Welfare Board, the Benue State Prerogative of Mercy, the Advisory Council of the Episcopal Commission on African Tradition Religion, and the Board of Governors of the College of Education, Katsina-Ala. 
He was Chairman of the Presbyteral Council, Dean of Makurdi Deanery, Diocese of Makurdi and Vicar-General, Diocese of Makurdi.

Political career

Adasu was elected the second Executive Governor of Benue State on 2 January 1992.
He was said to have had a positive impact on conditions during his two-year term.
He founded Benue State University on 27 December 1991.
He reactivated and upgraded the College of Education, Oju.
He conceived the concept of the Tarka Foundation, named after Senator Joseph Sarwuan Tarka and launched on 2 July 1992. The foundation's building occupies five hectares of land in Makurdi and includes an art gallery, conference rooms, recreational centers and chalets.
The mandate of the foundation is unclear.
Other projects that he started included BENCO roof tile, and the K/Ala fruit juice company, but he was not able to achieve a great deal during his short period in office.

Adasu said that politics is not a dirty game, but those who are in it for selfish reasons make it dirty. He said "I am in politics to baptise politics and make it pure".
He was removed from office when General Sani Abacha came to power in November 1993, replaced by Group Captain Joshua Obademi.

In the Nigerian Fourth Republic Adasu was appointed a member of the Independent Corrupt Practices and Other Related Offences Commission (ICPC) in January 2001.
He resigning from the ICPC in June 2002 to reenter politics.
As a member of the Alliance for Democracy (AD) party he challenged the incumbent Governor George Akume of the People's Democratic Party (PDP) in the April 2003 gubernatorial elections.
He was not successful.
In September 2004 he was head of one of the National Convention Committees for the AD, after a factional split in the party caused by the return of former chairman Ahmed Abdulkadir.

Adasu died on 20 November 2005. After his death Benue State University conferred  an honorary doctorate degree on Adasu.

References

1945 births
2005 deaths
Governors of Benue State
People from Benue State
St. John's University (New York City) alumni
Catholic University of America alumni
Nigerian Roman Catholics
Nigerian Christian clergy